University of Perugia (Italian Università degli Studi di Perugia) is a public-owned university based in Perugia, Italy. It was founded in 1308, as attested by the Bull issued by Pope Clement V certifying the birth of the Studium Generale.

The official seal of the university portraits Saint Herculan, one of the saint patrons, and the rampant crowned griffin, which is the city symbol: they represent the ecclesiastical and civil powers, respectively, which gave rise to the university in the Middle Ages.

History

One of the "free" universities of Italy, it was elevated into a studium generale on September 8, 1308, by the Bull "Super specula" of Clement V. A school of arts existed by about 1200, in which medicine and law were soon taught, with a strong commitment expressed by official documents of the City Council of Perugia. Before 1300 there were several universitates scholiarum. Jacobus de Belviso, a famous civil jurist, taught here from 1316 to 1321. By Bull on August 1, 1318, John XXII granted the privilege of conferring degrees in civil and canon law, and on February 18, 1321, in medicine and arts.

On May 19, 1355, the Emperor Charles IV issued a Bull confirming the papal elevation and raising it to the rank of an imperial university. This unusual mark of favour was given to assist Perugia after the terrible plague years 1348–49. In 1362 the Collegium Gregorianum (later called the Sapienza vecchia) was founded by Cardinal Nicolò Capocci for the maintenance of forty youths. Gregory XI, by Brief of October 11, 1371, gave the privileges of a studium generale to the new faculty of theology. This faculty was suppressed and its property merged in the university in 1811. The Collegio di S. Girolamo was    founded by Benedetto Guidalotti, Bishop of Recanatias a free hostel for impecunious strangers who wished to study law and medicine in 1426, with Martin V's approval, and transferred (as the Sapienza nuova) to the University. Suppressed by the French in 1798, it was reopened in 1807 by Pius VII as the Collegio Pio. In the Constitution of August 27, 1824, Leo XII made this the chief college of the university.

With the unification of Italy in 1860 the University of Perugia was established under the jurisdiction of the Rector and the Town Council, who issued statutes subject to approval by the Government. From 1944 to the present, the University of Perugia has achieved an outstanding reputation as one of the leading universities in Italy.

Since the time of Napoleon I the university has occupied the old Olivetan convent of Monte Morcino. There was a faculty of mathematics down to 1884. The statutes are modelled upon those of Bologna. The number of students at different dates were: 142 in 1339, 79 in 1881, 350 in 1911.

Organization
With its 16 faculties and a vast selection of first and second level and single cycle degree programs, the University of Perugia offers its main courses in Perugia and Terni, and specialized programs throughout the Umbria region in the cities of Assisi, Foligno, and Narni.

The faculties into which the university is divided are:

 Department of Agricultural, Food and Environmental Science
 Department of Chemistry, Biology and Biotechnology
 Department of Civil and Environmental Engineering
 Department of Economics
 Department of Engineering
 Department of Humanities, Ancient and Modern Languages, Literature and Cultures
 Department of Law
 Department of Mathematics and Computer Science
 Department of Medicine and Surgery
 Department of Pharmaceutical Sciences
 Department of Philosophy, Social Sciences and Education
 Department of Physics and Geology
 Department of Political Science
 Department of Veterinary Medicine

Its research programs are conducted by 14 departments with a total of 1,200 full-time staff.
The University's activities also include 25 service organizations and research centers as well as 11 libraries with rich collections and equipment.
It had a total enrolment of over 27,000 students for the 2021–2022 academic year.

Academic authorities
 Rector Prof. Maurizio Oliviero 
 Prorector Prof. Fausto Elisei 
 Deputy Rectors 
 Prof. Luca Bartocci
 Prof. Paolo Belardi
 Prof. Stefano Brancorsini
 Prof. Gabriele Cruciani
 Prof. Fausto Elisei
 Prof.ssa Carla Emiliani
 Prof. Daniele Parbuono
 Prof. Daniele Porena
 Prof. Roberto Rettori
 Prof.ssa Stefania Stefanelli
 Prof. Mario Tosti
 Prof. Helios Vocca

Eminent faculty and alumni
Among its eminent teachers were:

 Luca Pacioli (c. 1447 - 1517), father of accounting
 Jacobus de Belviso (c. 1270-1335), jurist
 Johannes Andreas, canonist
 Cino da Pistoia, (1270-1336), poet and jurist
 Bartolus de Saxoferrato, (1314–1357), famous civil jurist
 Baldus de Ubaldis (1327-1400),   jurist, (its figure is represented on all diploma certificates)
 Gentile da Foligno (d. 1348), physician
 Albericus Gentilis, founder of the science of international law
 Francesco della Rovere Pope (Sixtus IV)
 Annibale Mariotti, physician
 Annibale Vecchi, pharmacist
 Domenico Bruschi, botanist
 Bernardo Dessau, physicist
 Giuseppe Antinori, arcadian and classicist
 Francesco Coppola, politician
Among its students were:
 Nicholas IV
 Gregory XI (c. 1329 - 1378, r. 1370-1378)
 Innocent VII
 Martin V
 Pius III
 Julius II
 Julius III
 Urban VII
 Gregory XIV
 Clement VIII
 Paul V
 Ruggero Oddi, physician
 Michaëlle Jean, former Governor General of Canada and current Secretary-General of La Francophonie
 Monica Bellucci, actress
 Suze Rotolo
 Pier Paolo Pandolfi

Points of interest
 Orto Botanico dell'Università di Perugia, the university's botanical garden

In Popular Culture
The 1973 film Torso, a giallo directed by Sergio Martino, retrospectively recognized as one of the first "proto-slasher films" is set at the University of Perugia and surrounding locales.

See also
 List of Italian universities
 List of medieval universities
 Perugia

References

External links
   

 
1308 establishments in Europe
Perugia
Education in Umbria